Naitoa Ah Kuoi (born 7 October 1999) is a New Zealand rugby union player who plays for the  in Super Rugby. His playing position is lock. He has signed for the Chiefs squad in 2020.

Reference list

External links
itsrugby.co.uk profile

1999 births
New Zealand rugby union players
Living people
Rugby union locks
Moana Pasifika players
Wellington rugby union players
Chiefs (rugby union) players
Bay of Plenty rugby union players
Rugby union players from Wellington City